Partula rosea is a species of air-breathing tropical land snail, a terrestrial pulmonate gastropod mollusk in the family Partulidae.

Description
The length of the shell attains 22.4 mm.

Distribution
This species was endemic to Huahine, French Polynesia. It is now extinct in the wild, only existing in captivity.

Half the world's population of this snail is within one room at a zoo in the UK.

References

  Gerlach J. (2016). Icons of evolution: Pacific Island tree-snails of the family Partulidae. Phelsuma Press.

External links

 Broderip, W. J. (1832). New species of shells collected by Mr. Cuming on the western coast of south America and in the islands of the South Pacific Ocean. Proceedings of the Committee of Science and Correspondence of the Zoological Society of London. 2: 124-126
 Pfeiffer, L. (1857). Descriptions of fifty-eight new species of Helicea from the collection of H. Cuming, Esq. Proceedings of the zoological Society of London. 24 (321) 

Fauna of French Polynesia
Partula (gastropod)
Taxa named by William Broderip
Taxonomy articles created by Polbot
Gastropods described in 1832